Park Roads represent a subset of public roads designated and maintained by the Texas Department of Transportation (TxDOT). Park Roads are intended to provide access to and connection within Texas state parks. The system of Park Roads was established in 1937 at the request of the state parks board to establish maintenance of eight roads within the state's parks. The network of Park Roads has grown incrementally over the years along with the growth of parks now under the authority of the Texas Parks and Wildlife Department. Park Roads are marked with distinctive signage distinguishing them from other state-maintained highways.

Description

History
On September 22, 1936, the state highway commission initiated an investigation at the request of the state's parks board into the incorporation of certain park roads as part of the state highway system after which the highway commission would assume maintenance of these roads. The highway commission accepted routes in eight parks as the original Park Roads in the state system on June 22, 1937. The charter routes of the system were located in the following parks:
Bastrop State Park
Caddo Lake State Park
Davis Mountains State Park
Longhorn Caverns State Park
Palo Duro Canyon State Park
Big Bend State Park, now a national park: PR 6 designation later reassigned to Goliad State Park and Historic Site
Meridian State Park
Big Spring State Park

List

See also

References

External links
Texas Department of Transportation
Texas Highway Man

Park